"U.S.A." is a song by Japanese boy band Da Pump. It is a cover of the 1992 song by Italian singer Joe Yellow of the same name. The song was released on June 6, 2018.

"U.S.A." is Da Pump's first single in three and a half years after the release of "New Position"  in 2014. Initially Da Pump and their management had low expectations for their comeback, as their promotion events only took place at shopping malls. However, it soon became a summer hit, peaking high on various Japanese music charts.

Music video 

The music video features the members of Da Pump dancing in a dark room lit up in colorful lights. The choreography includes dance moves such as the dab, the Milly Rock, and the Shoot (known as the ). A video featuring the choreography was released on June 12, 2018.

Release and reception 
Initial public reaction ridiculed the song and music video due to Da Pump's age, dancing, and the outdated Eurobeat trend. Patrick St. Michel of The Japan Times likened the reaction to "watching your dad wax nostalgic and try to become a hypebeast at the same time". However, the song soon grew in popularity and became a summer hit for drawing sentimental value to the 1990s, especially among Hello! Project fans who were nostalgic for their early music style. The song was described as "tacky but cool" by the media. The music video gained 1 million views on its first week of release. By July 2018, the song had been downloaded more than 22,790 times.<ref></</ref>

The song inspired a trend called the "U.S.A. game", where people would sing, "C'mon, baby, America" (a line from the chorus) followed by a factual statement about the United States while keeping in rhythm. The success of "U.S.A." led Okayama Prefecture to creating an advertisement featuring a parody of the song to attract tourists and volunteers.

Performances 
Da Pump promoted "U.S.A." on Count Down TV on June 28, 2018. They made a surprise guest appearance at Hello! Project's 20th anniversary concert and performed the song.
Da Pump also performed "U.S.A." on December 1, 2018 before a Hisamitsu Springs volleyball match in Kobe, Japan.

Remixes 
CyberJapan Dancers released an EDM remix, titled "U.S.A. (CyberJapan Dancers Gaya Remix)", on August 22, 2018, accompanied with a music video release on August 16, 2018, on iTunes.

On December 25, 2019, another remix titled "2019 Heartbeat Mix" will be released on the Sonic Groove compilation album Heartbeat.

Track listing

Charts

Awards and nominations

References 

2018 singles
Da Pump songs
Songs about the United States
Japanese-language songs
Electronic dance music songs
Internet memes introduced in 2018